Skerrit may refer to:

Roosevelt Skerrit (born 1972), Dominican politician
Skerrit (Dungeons & Dragons), a fictional deity of centaurs in the Dungeons and Dragons worlds